Goose Nest is an unincorporated community in Berkeley County, West Virginia, United States.

References

Unincorporated communities in Berkeley County, West Virginia
Unincorporated communities in West Virginia